Wittes is a commune in the Pas-de-Calais department in the Hauts-de-France region of France.

Geography
Wittes is located 9 miles (14 km) southeast of Saint-Omer, at the N43 and D197 road junction and on the banks of the small river Melde, a tributary of the Lys.

Population

Places of interest
 The church of St.Omer, dating from the nineteenth century.

See also
Communes of the Pas-de-Calais department

References

External links

 Official commune website 

Communes of Pas-de-Calais